The War of the Worlds (also known in promotional material as H. G. Wells' The War of the Worlds) is a 1953 American science fiction horror film  directed by Byron Haskin, produced by George Pal, and starring Gene Barry and Ann Robinson. It is the first of several feature film adaptations of H. G. Wells' 1898 novel of the same name. The setting is changed from Victorian era England to 1953 Southern California. In the film, Earth is suddenly invaded by Martians, and American scientist Clayton Forrester searches for any weakness to stop them.
The War of the Worlds won an Academy Award for Best Visual Effects and went on to influence other science fiction films. In 2011, it was selected for preservation in the National Film Registry by the United States Library of Congress, who deemed it "culturally, historically, or aesthetically significant".

Plot
In Southern California, Dr. Clayton Forrester, a well-known atomic scientist, is fishing with colleagues when a large object crashes near the small town of Linda Rosa, California, southeast of Corona. At the impact site, he meets USC library science instructor Sylvia Van Buren and her uncle, Pastor Matthew Collins. Later that night, a round hatch on the object unscrews and falls away. As the three men standing guard at the site attempt to make contact while waving a white flag, a Martian heat-ray obliterates them. The United States Marine Corps later surrounds the crash site, as reports pour in of identical cylinders landing all over the world and destroying cities. Three Martian war machines emerge from the cylinder. Pastor Collins attempts to make contact with the aliens, but he is disintegrated. The Marines open fire, but are unable to penetrate the Martians' force field. The aliens counterattack with their heat-ray and skeleton-beam weapons, sending the Marines into full retreat. Air force jets next attack the Martian war machines, but are annihilated.

Attempting to escape in a small, single engine military spotter plane, Forrester and Sylvia crash land and hide in an abandoned farmhouse. They begin to develop closer feelings for each other just before the house is buried by yet another crashing cylinder. A long cable with an electronic eye explores the farmhouse from a nearby war machine and eventually spots them, but Forrester cuts off the lens housing using an axe. Later, when a Martian enters and approaches Sylvia, Forrester injures it with the axe and collects its blood on a cloth. They escape just before the farmhouse is obliterated by the Martian heat-ray. Forrester takes the electronic eye and blood sample to his team at Pacific Tech in the hope of finding a way to defeat the invaders. The scientists discover how the Martian eye works and also note that the alien blood is extremely anemic.

Many of the major world capitals fall silent, and global Martian victory is estimated to be only six days away. The United States government makes the decision to drop an atomic bomb on the original group of Martian war machines advancing towards Los Angeles from the east near the Puente Hills. The atomic blast, however, is totally ineffective. As the aliens continue their advance on Los Angeles, the city is evacuated. The Pacific Tech trucks are stopped by a mob bent on escape, and all the scientific equipment is destroyed. Forrester, Sylvia, and the other scientists become separated in the chaos.

Forrester searches for Sylvia in the deserted city. Based on a story she had told him earlier, he guesses she would take refuge in a church. After searching through several, he finds Sylvia among many praying and injured survivors. Just as the Martians attack near the church, their machines suddenly lose power one after the other and crash. Forrester sees one of the aliens expire while trying to leave its fallen war machine. The narrator observes that though the Martians were impervious to humanity's weapons, they had "no resistance to the bacteria in our atmosphere to which we have long since become immune. After all that men could do had failed, they were destroyed and humanity was saved by the littlest things, which God, in His wisdom, had put upon this Earth".

Cast

Production

The War of the Worlds opens with a black-and-white prologue featuring newsreel war footage and a voice-over by Paul Frees that describes the destructive technological advancements of Earthly warfare from World War I through World War II. The image then smash cuts to vivid Technicolor and the dramatic opening title card and credits.

The story begins with a series of color matte paintings by astronomical artist Chesley Bonestell that depict the planets of our Solar System, except Venus, about which little was known at the time. A narrator (Sir Cedric Hardwicke) tours the hostile environment of each world, eventually explaining to the audience why the Martians find our lush green and blue Earth the only world worthy of their scrutiny and coming invasion.

This is the first of two adaptations of Wells's classic science fiction filmed by George Pal. It is considered one of the great science fiction films of the 1950s.

Pal had planned for the final third of the film to be shot in the new 3D process to visually enhance the Martians' attack on Los Angeles. The plan was dropped before production began. World War II stock footage was used to produce a montage of destruction to show the worldwide invasion, with armies of all nations joining together to fight the invaders.

Dr. Forrester's and the other scientists' Pacific Tech (Pacific Institute of Science and Technology, represented by buildings on the Paramount studio lot) has since been part of other films and television episodes when it was decided to include a scientific California university without using the name of a real one.

The city of Corona, California was used as the shooting location of the fictitious town of Linda Rosa. St. Brendan's Catholic Church, at 310 South Van Ness Avenue in Los Angeles, was the setting for the climactic scene in which a large group of desperate people gather to pray. The rolling hills and main thoroughfares of El Sereno, Los Angeles, were also used in the film.

On the commentary track of the 2005 Special Collector's DVD Edition of War of the Worlds, Robinson and Barry say that the cartoon character Woody Woodpecker is in a treetop, center screen, when the first large Martian meteorite-ship crashes through the sky, near the beginning of the film. George Pal and Woody's creator, Walter Lantz, were close friends. Pal tried always to include Woody out of friendship and for good luck in his productions. Joe Adamson wrote years later: "Walter had been close friends with Pal ever since Pal had left Europe in advance of the war and arrived in Hollywood".

The prototype Northrop YB-49 Flying Wing is prominently featured in the atomic-bombing sequence. Pal and Haskin incorporated Northrop color footage of a YB-49 test flight, originally used in Paramount's Popular Science theatrical shorts, to show the Flying Wing's takeoff and bomb run.

Differences from the Wells novel
Caroline Blake has written that the film is very different from the original novel in its attitude toward religion, as reflected especially in the depiction of clergymen. "The staunchly secularist Wells depicted a cowardly and thoroughly uninspiring Curate, whom the narrator regards with disgust, with which the reader is invited to concur. In the film, there is instead the sympathetic and heroic Pastor Collins who dies a martyr's death. And then the film's final scene in the church, strongly emphasizing the Divine nature of Humanity's deliverance, has no parallel in the original book."

Pal's adaptation has many other differences from H. G. Wells's novel. The closest resemblance is probably that of the antagonists. The film's aliens are indeed Martians and invade Earth for the same reasons as those stated in the novel. The state of Mars suggests that it is becoming unable to support life, leading to the Martians' decision to try to make Earth their new home. They land in the same way, by crashing to Earth. The novel's spacecraft, however, are large, cylindrical projectiles fired from the Martian surface from a cannon, instead of the film's meteorite-spaceships; but the Martians emerge from their craft in the same way, by unscrewing a large, round hatch. They appear to have no use for humans in the film. In the novel, however, the invaders are observed "feeding" on humans by fatally transfusing their captives' blood supply directly into Martian bodies through pipettes. There is later speculation about the Martians' eventually using trained human slaves to hunt down all remaining survivors after they conquer Earth. In the film, the Martians do not bring their fast-growing red weed with them, but they are defeated by Earth microorganisms, as in the novel. However, they die from the effects of the microorganisms within three days of the landing of the first meteorite-ship; in the novel, the Martians die within about three weeks of their invasion of England.

The film's Martians bear no physical resemblance to those of the novel, who are described as bear-sized, roundish creatures with grayish-brown bodies, "merely heads", with quivering beak-like, V-shaped mouths dripping saliva. They have sixteen whip-like tentacles in two groupings of eight arranged on each side of their mouths and two large "luminous, disk-like eyes". Because of budget constraints, their film counterparts are short, reddish-brown creatures with two long, thin arms with three long, thin fingers with suction-cup tips. The Martian head is a broad "face" at the top-front of its broad-shouldered upper torso, the only apparent feature of which is a single, large eye with three distinctly colored lenses of red, blue, and green. The Martians' lower extremities are never shown. Some speculative designs suggest three thin legs resembling their fingers, and others show them as bipeds with short, stubby legs with three-toed feet.

The film's Martian war machines are more like those of the book than they first seem. The novel's war machines are 10-story-tall fast-moving tripods made of glittering metal, each with a "brazen hood" atop the body, moving "to and fro" as the machine moves. A heat-ray projector on an articulated arm is connected to the front of each machine's main body. However, the film's war machines are shaped like manta rays, with a bulbous, elongated green window at the front, through which the Martians observe their surroundings. On top of the machine is the cobra-like head heat-ray attached to a long, narrow, goose-neck extension, which can fire in any direction. They can be mistaken for flying machines, but Forrester states that they are lifted by invisible legs. One scene when the first war machine emerges has faint traces of three "energy legs" beneath that leave three sparking traces where they touch the burning ground, so they are tripods, though they are never so called. Whereas the novel's machines have no protection against the British army and navy cannon fire, the film's war machines have a force field surrounding them, described by Forrester as a "protective blister".

The Martian weaponry is also partially unchanged. The heat-ray has the very same effect as that of the novel. However, the novel's heat-ray mechanism is briefly described as just a rounded hump when its silhouette rises above the landing crater's rim; it fires an invisible energy beam in a wide arc while still in the pit made by the first Martian cylinder after it crash-lands. The film's first heat-ray scene has a projector shaped like a cobra head with a single, red pulsing light, which likely acts as a targeting telescope for the Martians inside their war machine shaped like a manta ray. The novel describes another weapon, the "black smoke" used to kill all life; the war machines fire canisters containing a black smoke-powder through a bazooka-like tube accessory. When dispersed, this black powder is lethal to all life forms who breathe it. This weapon is replaced in the film by a Martian "skeleton beam" of green pulsing energy bursts fired from the wingtips of the manta-ray machines; these bursts break apart the sub-atomic bonds that hold matter together. These beams are used off-screen to obliterate several French cities.

The plot of the film is very different from the novel, which tells the story of a 19th-century writer (with additional narration in later chapters by his medical-student younger brother), who journeys through Victorian London and its southwestern suburbs while the Martians attack, eventually being reunited with his wife; the film's protagonist is a California scientist who falls in love with a former college student after the Martian invasion begins. However, certain points of the film's plot are similar to the novel, from the crash-landing of the Martian meteorite-ships to their eventual defeat by Earth's microorganisms. Forrester also experiences similar events like the book's narrator, with an ordeal in a destroyed house, observing an actual Martian up close, and eventually reuniting with his love interest at the end of the story. The film has more of a Cold War theme with the atomic bomb against the invading enemy and the mass destruction that such a global war would inflict on humanity.

Special effects

An effort was made to avoid the stereotypical flying saucer look of UFOs. The Martian war machines were designed by Albert Nozaki with a sinister manta ray shape floating above the ground. Three Martian war machine props were made of copper. The same blueprints were used a decade later (without neck and cobra head) to construct the alien spacecraft in the film Robinson Crusoe on Mars, also directed by Byron Haskin. That prop was reportedly melted for a scrap copper recycling drive.

Each Martian machine is topped with an articulated metal neck and arm, culminating in the cobra head heat ray projector, housing a single electronic eye that operates both as a periscope and as a weapon. The electronic eye houses a heat ray, which pulses and fires red sparking beams, all accompanied by thrumming and a high-pitched clattering shriek when the ray was used. The distinctive sound effect of the weapon was created by an orchestra performing a written score, mainly with violins and cellos. For many years, it was utilized as a standard ray-gun sound on children's television shows and the science-fiction anthology series The Outer Limits, particularly in the episode "The Children of Spider County".

The machines also fire a pulsing green ray (referred to in dialog as "a skeleton beam") from their wingtips, generating a distinctive sound and disintegrating their targets. This second weapon is a replacement for the chemical weapon black smoke described in Wells's novel. Its sound effect (created by striking a high tension cable with a hammer) was reused in Star Trek: The Original Series, accompanying the launch of photon torpedoes. The sound when the Martian ships begin to move was also reused by Star Trek as the sound of an overloading hand phaser. Another prominent sound effect is a chattering, synthesized echo, perhaps representing some kind of Martian sonar sounds like hissing electronic rattlesnakes.

When the large Marine force opens fire on the Martians with everything in its heavy arsenal, each Martian machine is protected by an impenetrable force field that resembles, when briefly visible between explosions, the clear jar placed over a mantle clock, or a bell jar with a cylindrical shape and a hemispherical top. This effect was accomplished with simple matte paintings on clear glass, which were then photographed and combined with other effects, and optically printed together during post-production.

The disintegration effect took 144 separate matte paintings to create. The sound effects of the war machines' heat rays firing were created by mixing the sound of three electric guitars being recorded backwards. The Martian's scream in the farmhouse ruins was created by mixing the sound of a microphone scraping along dry ice being combined with a woman's recorded scream and then reversed.

There were many problems trying to create the walking tripods of Wells's novel. It was eventually decided to make the Martian machines appear to float in the air on three invisible legs. To visualize them, subtle special effects of downward lights were to be added directly under the moving war machines; however, in the final film, these only appear when one of the first machines can be seen rising from the Martian's landing site. It proved too difficult and dangerous to mark out the invisible legs while smoke and other effects must remain visible beneath the machines, and the effect also created a major fire hazard. In all of the subsequent scenes, however, the three invisible leg beams create small, sparking fires where they touch the ground.

Quality of special effects
For 50 years, from the late 1960s when The War of the Worlds 3-strip Technicolor prints were replaced by the easier-to-use and less expensive Eastman Color stock, the quality of the film's special effects suffered dramatically. This degraded the lighting, timing, and image resolution, causing the original invisible overhead wires suspending the Martian war machines to become increasingly visible with each succeeding film and video format change. This led many, including respected critics, to mistakenly believe the effects were originally of low quality.

Reception

Release
The official Hollywood premiere of The War of the Worlds was on February 20, 1953, although it did not go into general theatrical release until late that year. The film was both a critical and box-office success. The film accrued $2,000,000 in distributors' domestic (U.S. and Canada) rentals, making the film the year's biggest science fiction hit. ("Rentals" refers to the distributor and studio's share of the box-office gross, which, according to Gebert, is roughly half of the money generated by ticket sales.)

Critical reaction
In The New York Times, A. H. Weiler's review commented: "[The film is] an imaginatively conceived, professionally turned adventure, which makes excellent use of Technicolor, special effects by a crew of experts, and impressively drawn backgrounds ... Director Byron Haskin, working from a tight script by Barré Lyndon, has made this excursion suspenseful, fast and, on occasion, properly chilling". "Brog" in Variety said, "[It is] a socko science-fiction feature, as fearsome as a film as was the Orson Welles 1938 radio interpretation ... what starring honors there are go strictly to the special effects, which create an atmosphere of soul-chilling apprehension so effectively [that] audiences will actually take alarm at the danger posed in the picture. It can't be recommended for the weak-hearted, but to the many who delight in an occasional good scare, it's socko entertainment of hackle-raising quality". The Monthly Film Bulletin of the UK called it "the best of the postwar American science-fiction films; the Martian machines have a quality of real terror, their sinister apparitions, prowlings and pulverisings are spectacularly well done, and the scenes of panic and destruction are staged with real flair". Richard L. Coe of The Washington Post called it "to put it gently, terrific", and "for my money, the King Kong of its day".

The War of the Worlds won an Academy Award for Special Effects as the sole nominee that year. Everett Douglas was nominated for Film Editing, and the Paramount Studio Sound Department and Loren L. Ryder were nominated for Sound Recording.

The War of the Worlds still receives high acclaim from some critics. On the film review aggregator website Rotten Tomatoes, it has an 89% rating based on 35 critics, with an average rating of 7.20/10. The consensus states: "Though it's dated in spots, The War of the Worlds retains an unnerving power, updating H. G. Wells's classic sci-fi tale to the Cold War era and featuring some of the best special effects of any 1950s film".

4K restoration
In 2018, a new, fully restored 4K Dolby Vision transfer from the original three-strip Technicolor negatives was published on iTunes. In July 2020, the film was reissued on Blu-ray and DVD by The Criterion Collection in the United States using the same 4K remaster and restoration. The Blu-ray documentation says the transfer process and careful color and contrast calibrations allowed the special effects to be restored to Technicolor release print quality.

Legacy
The War of the Worlds was deemed culturally, historically, or aesthetically significant in 2011 by the United States Library of Congress for preservation in the National Film Registry. The Registry noted the film's release during the early years of the Cold War and how it used "the apocalyptic paranoia of the atomic age". The Registry also cited the special effects, which at its release were called "soul-chilling, hackle-raising, and not for the faint of heart".

The Martians were ranked the 27th best villains in the American Film Institute's list AFI's 100 Years...100 Heroes and Villains.

The 1988 War of the Worlds TV series is a sequel to the Pal film. Ann Robinson reprises her role as Sylvia Van Buren in three episodes. Robinson also reprises her role in two other films, first as Dr. Van Buren in 1988's Midnight Movie Massacre and then as Dr. Sylvia Van Buren in 2005's The Naked Monster.

The 1996 film Independence Day has several allusions to Pal's  1953 War of the Worlds. The failed attempt of a dropped atomic bomb is replaced with a nuclear-armed cruise missile launched by a B-2 Spirit bomber (a direct descendant of the Northrop YB-49 bomber in the 1953 film) and Captain Hiller being based in El Toro, California, which Dr. Forrester mentions as the home of the Marines, which make the first assault on the invading Martians in Pal's film.

The Asylum's 2005 direct-to-DVD H. G. Wells' War of the Worlds has mild references to the Pal version. The Martian's mouth has three tongues that closely resemble the three Martian fingers in the Pal film. The Asylum film has scenes of power outages after the aliens' arrival via meteorite-ships. As in the Pal film, refugees hide in the mountains, instead of hiding underground as in the Wells novel, and the protagonist actively tries to fight the aliens by biological means.

Steven Spielberg's 2005 version, War of the Worlds, although an adaptation of the Wells novel, has several references to the 1953 film. Gene Barry and Ann Robinson have cameo appearances near the end, and the invading aliens have three-fingered hands but are reptilian, walking tripods. A long, snaking, alien camera probe is deployed by the invaders. In his 2018 film Ready Player One, Spielberg included a fallen Martian war machine more akin to the 1953 film.

Tomohiro Nishikado, creator of the breakthrough 1978 video game Space Invaders, stated that seeing the film in childhood was one of the inspirations for the inclusion and the design of the aliens in the game.

Mystery Science Theater 3000 named one of its lead characters, the mad scientist  Dr. Clayton Forrester, as a homage to the 1953 film.

In 2004, War of the Worlds was presented with a Retrospective Hugo Award for 1954 in the category of Best Dramatic Presentation — Short Form (works running 90 minutes or less).

See also
 List of works based on The War of the Worlds

References

Bibliography

 Aberly, Rachel and Volker Engel. The Making of Independence Day. New York: HarperPaperbacks, 1996. .
 Adamson, Joe. The Walter Lantz Story: with Woody Woodpecker and Friends. New York: G.P. Putnam's Sons, 1985. .
 Booker, M. Keith. Historical Dictionary of Science Fiction Cinema. Metuchen, New Jersey: Scarecrow Press, Inc., 2010. 
 Gebert, Michael. The Encyclopedia of Movie Awards, New York: St. Martin's Press, 1996. .
 Hickman, Gail Morgan. The Films of George Pal. New York: A. S. Barnes and Company, 1977. .
 Miller, Thomas Kent. Mars in the Movies: A History. Jefferson, North Carolina: McFarland & Company, 2016. .
 Parish, James Robert and Michael R. Pitts. The Great Science Fiction Pictures. Jefferson, North Carolina: McFarland & Company, 1977. .
 Rubin, Steve. "The War of the Worlds". Cinefantastique magazine, Volume 5, No. 4, 1977. A comprehensive "making of" retrospective and review of the film.
 Strick, Philip. Science Fiction Movies. London: Octopus Books Limited, 1976. .
 Warren, Bill. Keep Watching The Skies Vol I: 1950–1957. Jefferson, North Carolina: McFarland & Company, 1982. .
 Willis, Don, ed. Variety's Complete Science Fiction Reviews. New York: Garland Publishing, Inc., 1985. .

External links

 
 The Complete War of the Worlds Website
 The War of the Worlds: Sky on Fire an essay by J. Hoberman at the Criterion Collection
 Making of the movie
 Interview with War of the Worlds star Ann Robinson
 The War of the Worlds on Lux Radio Theater: February 8, 1955. Adaptation of 1953 film.
 The War of the Worlds (1953) in 30 seconds, re-enacted by bunnies. at Angry Alien Productions
 The War of the Worlds - A Radio and Film Score Remembrance 

1953 films
1950s science fiction films
Alien invasions in films
American disaster films
American science fiction war films
Apocalyptic films
Films about extraterrestrial life
Films about nuclear war and weapons
Films about the United States Marine Corps
Films about the United States Army
Films adapted into television shows
Films based on The War of the Worlds
Films directed by Byron Haskin
Films produced by George Pal
Films scored by Leith Stevens
Films set in Los Angeles
Films set in the 1950s
Films shot in California
Films that won the Best Visual Effects Academy Award
United States National Film Registry films
Paramount Pictures films
1950s English-language films
1950s American films